is a 2001 Japanese animated short film written and directed by Hayao Miyazaki, shown only in the Ghibli Museum in Mitaka, Japan. The film has a running time of 16 minutes. It is drawn in a different, simpler style compared to other Studio Ghibli films and uses bright pastel colors.

Kujiratori tells the story of school children pretending they are building a boat. As imagination replaces reality, they find themselves on the ocean, hunting for a whale. A big, gentle whale appears, accompanies them back to land and plays with them. Then the fantasy ends and the children are back in their class room.

The film was shown at the 2002 New York International Children's Film Festival. It won the Ōfuji Noburō Award at the 2001 Mainichi Film Awards.

References

External links
 Kujiratori on the Ghibli Museum's website.
 
 
 

2001 anime films
Anime short films
Fiction about whales
Films directed by Hayao Miyazaki
2000s Japanese-language films
Studio Ghibli animated films
2000s animated short films
Films scored by Yuji Nomi